Toru Mateariki (born 27 June 2002) is a Cook Islands footballer who currently plays for Nikao Sokattak and the Cook Islands national team.

Club career 
Mateariki played for Nikao Sokattak since at least 2016. That year he scored in the final of the under-17 league to win the title. By 2018 he was playing with the first team in the top flight. In 2021 he scored against Tupapa Maraerenga in both the Round Cup and Cook Islands Cup finals to secure the titles. The team also won the latter tournament in 2020.

International 
Mateariki was part of the Cook Islands squad chosen for the 2017 OFC U-17 Championship. However, he remained as an unused substitute over the team's three matches. He was selected again for the  2018 OFC U-16 Championship. He converted a penalty against American Samoa for his team's only goal of the tournament. 

In March 2022 Mateariki was included in the Cook Islands senior squad for 2022 FIFA World Cup qualification. He went on to make his senior international debut on 17 March 2022 as a starter in the opening match against the Solomon Islands.

International career statistics

Personal
He is the brother of fellow footballer Tamaiva Mateariki.

References

External links

Living people
2002 births
Association football forwards
Cook Islands international footballers
Cook Island footballers